The 2015 season is Cruzeiro's ninety-fourth season in existence and the club's forty-fifth consecutive season in the top flight of Brazilian football.

Statistics

Hat tricks

Overall

Competitions

Campeonato Mineiro

League table

First stage

Semi-finals

Campeonato Brasileiro Série A

League table

Results summary

Results

Copa do Brasil

Round of 16

Cruzeiro  joined the competition in the round of 16

Copa Libertadores

Group stage

Knockout phase

Round of 16

Quarter finals

References

Cruzeiro Esporte Clube seasons
Cruzeiro